Peter Frank Schabarum (January 9, 1929 – August 2, 2021) was an American football player and politician who was a member of the California State Assembly and the Los Angeles County Board of Supervisors.

Biography

Schabarum was born January 9, 1929, in Los Angeles. He attended and played football and baseball at the University of California, Berkeley.

He was drafted by the San Francisco 49ers in the 2nd round (17th overall) of the 1951 NFL Draft, and played for the 49ers in 1951, 1953 and 1954, taking time off from his football career to serve in the United States Air Force during the Korean War.

Politician
Schabarum represented the 49th district in the California State Assembly from 1967 to 1972. He was appointed to the Los Angeles County Board of Supervisors in March 1972 by Gov. Ronald Reagan following the death of incumbent Frank G. Bonelli and elected to the position three months later in a hotly contested special election that pitted him against his former roommate and colleague Assemblyman William Campbell. Schabarum was re-elected in 1974, 1978, 1982 and 1986. He did not seek re-election in 1990, but served three extra months until Feb. 28, 1991 to allow a special election to be held following a court ruling that redrew the boundaries of his district to create a majority-Latino district, later occupied by Gloria Molina.

Schabarum was noted for opposing government unions, supporting privatization of certain county duties, and supporting the decentralization of County government. In addition, he was the leading backer of California's Proposition 140 on the 1990 ballot, which imposed term limits on the California Legislature.

Tax evasion conviction
When Schabarum left office, his unspent campaign funds were transferred to a nonprofit organization, the Foundation for Citizen Representation. That foundation later transferred $50,000 to a foundation affiliated with the Los Angeles County Museum of Natural History, which then subsequently used the funds for overseas trips for him and his wife after he left office. Prosecutors charged Schabarum with felony grand theft, tax evasion and perjury, but Schabarum took a plea bargain to plead guilty only on the tax evasion charges, receiving three years of probation. Two years later, the charges were reduced to misdemeanors and the probation was terminated early.

Personal life
Schabarum died of natural causes on August 1, 2021, at the age of 92.

Parks

Schabarum Regional Park
Peter F. Schabarum Regional Park, locally known as Schabarum Regional Park, is located in Rowland Heights, eastern Los Angeles County, California. It is in his former supervisorial district, and named after him. The regional park offers playgrounds, picnic areas, and horseback riding and trails in the surrounding Puente Hills.

Cherry Blossom Festival
Schabarum Regional Park is also known for ume and sakura cherry blossoms. 500 ume trees were donated by Kairaku-en in Mito, Ibaraki, Japan when the two parks established a "sister-park" relationship in 1992.

Schabarum Trail Park
The Schabarum Trail Park is located near Walnut, also in his former supervisorial district.

References

External links

 Peter F. Schabarum Regional Park - Los Angeles County Department of Parks and Recreation
 Schabarum Regional Park Support Foundation

1929 births
2021 deaths
Los Angeles County Board of Supervisors
Republican Party members of the California State Assembly
Sportspeople from Los Angeles County, California
California Golden Bears football players
San Francisco 49ers players
University of California, Berkeley alumni
People from Indian Wells, California